Arvo Huutoniemi  (24 October 1913 – 21 May 1996) was a Finnish discus thrower. He was born in Lehtimäki.

He competed at the 1948 Summer Olympics in London, where he placed 9th in the final. He also competed at the 1952 Summer Olympics in Helsinki.

References

1913 births
1996 deaths
People from Lehtimäki
Finnish male discus throwers
Athletes (track and field) at the 1948 Summer Olympics
Athletes (track and field) at the 1952 Summer Olympics
Olympic athletes of Finland
Sportspeople from South Ostrobothnia